Reata is another term for a lasso.

Reata may also refer to:
 Reata (comics), a fictional character
 Reata Pharmaceuticals, an American company
 Reata Restaurant, an American group of restaurants